The American Institute Fair was held annually from 1829 until at least 1897 in New York City by the American Institute. The American Institute was founded in 1829 "for the encouragement of agriculture, commerce, manufactures, and the arts." The fair is sometimes considered the first world's fair in the United States, though it was fairly small by later standards, drawing about 30,000 attendees per year. It was held at Niblo's Garden in New York before being moved to the Crystal Palace in New York.

"At these fairs were displayed  the finest products of agriculture and manufacturing, the newest types of machinery, the most recent contributions of inventive genius...[the fairs] served a two-fold purpose: that of playing the part of demonstrator to the  public and that of furnishing an incentive to the exhibitors, both through competition and through the desire to win the very liberal awards and premiums."

References
 F. W. Wile, ed., A century of industrial progress, New York (published for the American Institute of the City of New York), 1928.
E. Robey, "The Utility of Art: Mechanics’ Institute Fairs in New York City, 1828–1876," Ph.D. Dissertation, Columbia University, 2000.

1829 establishments in New York (state)
1897 disestablishments in New York (state)
1897 in New York City
19th century in Manhattan
Agricultural shows in the United States
Annual events in New York (state)
Festivals established in 1829
Recurring events disestablished in 1897
World's fairs in New York City